Sr. Robert Scully (born 20 November 1960) is a Malaysian former football player and coach.

He formerly played for Penang FA in Malaysia Cup competition during the 1980s.

Robert has worked at Malaysian National Sports Council (Majlis Sukan Negara) before accepting the job as head coach for Penang FA in early 2011. He was sacked from his post in April 2011 due to poor performance from Penang FA which has seen the team occupying the last place in the Malaysian Premier League for that season.

In early 2012, he works as assistant coach at Indonesia Super League team Deltras F.C.

In June 2012, he was appointed as the head coach of Perlis FA. When Yunus Alif was appointed the head coach of Perlis in December 2012, Scully was demoted to become assistant head coach.

Robert Scully, is currently employed as The Football coach at Uplands International School Penang. He has since coached them into winning the Phuket 7's Plate, MSSPP Tournaments etc;. The Current Uplands Football side includes players such as; Liam Ryan Sleep, Finn Ivanovic Kupin, Joe-Ben Hart and Marcus Tsui as key players.

References

1960 births
Living people
People from Penang
Malaysian footballers
Penang F.C. players
Association footballers not categorized by position